Florence Hotel may refer to:

 Hotel Florence, a former hotel in Chicago, Illinois
 Florence Hotel, Florence, Kentucky; listed on the National Register of Historic Places in Boone County, Kentucky
 Florence Hotel (Missoula, Montana), listed on the National Register of Historic Places

See also
 Florence Hotel Tree, a San Diego Historic Landmark